All In Magazine is an American print magazine and website focusing on poker, fantasy sports, and eSports (competitive videogaming). The magazine was founded as the "poker boom" was taking off in 2004 and centered primarily on poker until 2013.

History

The original print edition of All In launched at the 2004 World Series of Poker, one year after amateur Chris Moneymaker won the World Series of Poker Main Event and moved poker into the mainstream. The magazine settled into its acclaimed editorial style in 2005, after Eric Raskin was hired as editor-in-chief and Will Tims was hired as art director. Starting with the February 2015 issue.

Events

ALL IN Super Bowl Party

In 2014, at Manhattan's Canoe Studios, All In worked with Heineken and Esquire to put on the Esquire Magazine/ALL IN/Heineken 2014 Super Bowl Celebration Charity Poker Party in New York City (the recipient of the evening's fundraising and the administrative entity was Career Gear, a 501 c3 organization).

In 2015, the three-day event in Scottsdale, Arizona, was put together to gain exposure, and raise money for All In Cause with numerous celebrity personalities in attendance.

Poker Player of the Year

All In awards an annual Poker Player of the Year honor based on a poll of poker professionals.

Year and player
 2005 - Phil Ivey
 2006 - Allen Cunningham
 2007 - J.C. Tran
 2008 - John Phan
 2009 - Phil Ivey
 2010 - Michael Mizrachi
 2013 - Daniel Negreanu
 2014 - Daniel Colman

References

External links
 

Monthly magazines published in the United States
Sports magazines published in the United States
Magazines established in 2004
Magazines published in Arizona
Poker publications